Leo H. Susman (April 27, 1879 - December 19, 1928) served in the California State Assembly for the 40th district from 1903 to 1905.

References

Australian emigrants to the United States
Republican Party members of the California State Assembly
1879 births
1928 deaths